Bhupal Chandra Panda (  25 December 1913 – 16 September 1996 ) was an Indian revolutionary and member of the Bengal Volunteers who carried out assassinations against British colonial officials in an attempt to secure Indian independence.

Early life and education 
Bhupal Chandra Panda was born in Nandigram in the year 1911. Jaminder Braja Mohan Vidyaratna and Swarnamoyee Devi were his parents. After passing the matriculation examination from  Nandigram BMT Sikshaniketan he was admitted to Prabhat Kumar College, Contai for further studies. He was a student of first batch in this college. At that time he organised Pichhaboni Salt Satyagragha and suffered physical torture by British Police. Later he joined the Bengal Volunteers, a revolutionary organisation of British India.

Revolutionary activities 
After joining the Bengal Volunteers he formed a group with the members of BV.  The members of this group conducted a number of Swadeshi robberies in several areas in undivided Bengal in order to raise funds for buying arms and ammunitions for revolutionary activities. He was convicted in the murder case of Magistrate Burge as he was collecting money for this purpose but it cannot be proved as Barrister  Birendranath Sasmal fought for him. But he was convicted in a political robbery case in Kulmoni dacoity Case under Narayangarh Police Jurisdiction. He was arrested from Belda Railway Station with a friend. Later he was punished for life imprisonment in Andaman. where he was joined with the other members of the Bengal volunteers i.e. Kamakhya Charan Ghosh, Sonatan Roy, Nanda Dulal Singh, Sukumar Sen Gupta, Santi Gopal Sen, Prabhanshu Sekhar Pal, and Sailesh Chandra Ghose etc. After release he took the leadership of Tebhaga Movement in undivided Midnapore district.

Later life 
After independence of India, Panda won several elections, which included the Nandigram seat of West Bengal Assembly in 1957, 1967, 1969, 1971, 1972 and 1982, total six times. All time he was the winner of the Assembly poll as a CPI candidate. For the rest of his life he worked as a social worker.  He died on 8 October 1992

References

1911 births
1992 deaths
Revolutionary movement for Indian independence
Indian nationalism
Indian revolutionaries
Revolutionaries from West Bengal
Bengali politicians
West Bengal MLAs 1957–1962
West Bengal MLAs 1967–1969
West Bengal MLAs 1969–1971
West Bengal MLAs 1971–1972
West Bengal MLAs 1972–1977
West Bengal MLAs 1982–1987
Indian independence activists from West Bengal